Slafkovský is a Slovak surname. Notable people with the surname include:

Alexander Slafkovský (born 1983), Slovak slalom canoeist
Juraj Slafkovský (born 2004), Slovak professional ice hockey forward

Slovak-language surnames